Leslie Roger Wootton (29 June 1944 – 5 July 2017) was an aeronautical engineer and balloonist. He was dean of engineering for City University and in 1966 prepared a report on the aircraft maintenance industry for the British Civil Aviation Authority.

References 

1944 births
2017 deaths
Aeronautical engineers
People from Sutton, London
Alumni of City, University of London
People educated at Kingston Grammar School
Academics of City, University of London
Fellows of the Royal Academy of Engineering
English balloonists
Scientists of the National Physical Laboratory (United Kingdom)